Lindell may refer to;

 Lindell (surname)
 Lindell, Missouri, U.S.
 Lindell, Virginia, U.S.

People with the given name
 Lindell Holmes, American boxer
 Lin Houston, former American football player
 Lindell Shumake, American politician
 Lindell Wigginton (born 1998), Canadian basketball player in the Israeli Premier League